Jalan Utama Tenggaroh, Federal Route 1393, is a federal road in Johor, Malaysia.

At most sections, the Federal Route 1393 was built under the JKR R5 road standard, with a speed limit of 90 km/h.

List of junctions

Malaysian Federal Roads